Line by Line is an album by jazz bassist John Patitucci released in 2006 by Concord Records. The album consists of Patitucci with saxophonist Chris Potter, guitarist Adam Rogers, and drummer Brian Blade. Patitucci wrote the compositions except for one by Rogers, one by Monk, a classical piece by Manuel de Falla, and a traditional spiritual.

Track listing

Personnel 
 John Patitucci – double bass, six-string bass guitar
 Chris Potter – tenor saxophone
 Adam Rogers – electric guitar, nylon-string guitar
 Jeremy McCoy – double bass
 Brian Blade – drums
 Richard Rood – violin
 Elizabeth Lim-Dutton – violin
 Lawrence Dutton – viola

References

2006 albums
John Patitucci albums